Antonio Tornielli (27 January 1579 – 8 March 1650) was a Roman Catholic prelate who served as Bishop of Novara (1636–1650).

Biography
Antonio Tornielli was born in Novara, Italy. On 15 December 1636, he was appointed by Pope Urban VIII as Bishop of Novara. On 25 January 1637, he was consecrated bishop by Antonio Marcello Barberini, Cardinal-Priest of Sant'Onofrio with Faustus Poli, Titular Archbishop of Amasea, and Celso Zani, Bishop of Città della Pieve, as co-consecrators. He served as Bishop of Novara until his death on 8 March 1650.

References

External links and additional sources
 (for Chronology of Bishops) 
 (for Chronology of Bishops) 

1579 births
1650 deaths
17th-century Italian Roman Catholic archbishops
Bishops appointed by Pope Urban VIII
Inquisitors of Malta